Turning Point' is an album led by jazz pianist Paul Bley collecting studio recordings from 1964 and two concert recordings from 1968 which was released on Bley's own Improvising Artists label in 1975.

Reception

Allmusic awarded the album 3 stars calling it "Very interesting if not quite essential music".

Track listing
 "Calls" (Carla Bley) - 6:10   
 "Turning" (Paul Bley) - 6:30   
 "King Korn" (Carla Bley) - 6:00   
 "Ictus" (Carla Bley) - 4:05   
 "Mr. Joy" (Annette Peacock) - 3:50   
 "Kid Dynamite" (Peacock) - 3:40   
 "Ida Lupino" (Carla Bley) - 5:20  
Recorded at Mirasound Studio, New York City on March 9, 1964 (tracks 1-4 & 7) and at the University of Washington in Seattle on  May 10, 1968 (tracks 5 & 6)

Personnel 
Paul Bley - piano
John Gilmore - tenor saxophone (tracks 1-4 & 7)
Gary Peacock - bass  
Billy Elgart (tracks 5 & 6), Paul Motian (tracks 1-4 & 7) - drums

References 

1975 albums
Paul Bley albums
Improvising Artists Records albums